Unison Historic District is a national historic district located at Unison, near Middleburg, Loudoun County, Virginia.  It encompasses 41 contributing buildings and 3 contributing structures in the village of Unison. It is primarily residential, but also includes a church, former school, store, and saddle-maker's shop.  The oldest buildings are "Butterland" and "Elton."  Other notable buildings include the Thornton Walker House, Mary Phillips House, Henry Evans House, Glatton Folly (c. 1820), and Unison United Methodist Church.

It was listed on the National Register of Historic Places in 2003. and expanded to 62 contributing buildings in 2011 as the Unison Battlefield Historic District.

References

Historic districts in Loudoun County, Virginia
National Register of Historic Places in Loudoun County, Virginia
Historic districts on the National Register of Historic Places in Virginia